Nicolas Roy was a French stone mason who worked in Scotland for James V and his second wife Mary of Guise. 

Nicolas Roy may have been the leader of the group of stonemasons recruited by Antoinette of Bourbon, Duchess of Guise, the mother of Mary of Guise. The Duchess wrote that she had found a mason with a high reputation who promised to go Scotland and bring a good companion. The masons travelled to Scotland via Paris. The Duchess also sent expert miners to look for Scottish gold. Mary of Guise wrote to her mother that she was pleased with the masons.

The miners were looked after by the goldsmith John Mosman and sent to Crawford Moor escorted by a messenger to translate for them until they learnt the Scots language.

He was appointed master mason to the king on 22 April 1539 with an annual fee of £6-13-4d over and above any wages for mason work to be paid by the Master of Work, John Scrimgeour. Nicolas Roy was later listed in a household roll of Mary of Guise, and mentioned in her household books. He made some alterations and repairs for Mary of Guise and her infant daughter Mary, Queen of Scots, at Stirling Castle in 1544. The brief account written in French mentions lime for repairing the wall of the park and two carpenters who made wheelbarrows.

Other French craftsmen working on the Scottish royal palace include the woodcarver and metal-worker Andrew Mansioun and the painter Pierre Quesnel.

Falkland Palace
One payment records calls Roy the principal stonemason at Falkland Palace. His name appears in the records for building Falkland Palace from June 1539 onwards. He was paid 21 shillings weekly and his three colleagues or "servitours" received the same. At this time, James V was building and converting his father's lodgings at Falkland into a palace in French renaissance style. The palace effectively belonged to Mary of Guise as part of her jointure. The accounts do not specify exactly what work Nicolas Roy and his workshop undertook, but they may have carved the portrait medallions or roundels that decorate the internal façades of the courtyard. A sculptor known as Peter Flemishman made the statues of saints for the niches on the entrance façade.

During the works at Falkland, the French masons made two excursions to St Andrews to advise on the building of a new college under the patronage of Cardinal David Beaton.

Another French stone mason, Moyse or Mogin Martin, first employed at Dunbar Castle by the Duke of Albany, worked at Falkland until his death in March 1538. His son also called Moyse Martin continued to work at Falkland. The elder Moyse Martin travelled to France with James V in 1536 and perhaps gained inspiration for the royal works in Scotland at this time.

References

16th-century Scottish people
Court of James V of Scotland
Scottish stonemasons
People of Falkland Palace